RVW or RvW may refer to:

 Ralph Vaughan Williams (1872–1958), English composer of symphonies, chamber music, opera, choral music, and film scores
 Richard von Weizsäcker (1920–2015), German statesman and President of Germany, 1984–1994
 Ricky van Wolfswinkel (born 1989), Dutch footballer
 Roe v. Wade, a landmark decision by the United States Supreme Court on the issue of abortion